Rick Thomas Story (born August 28, 1984) is a retired American mixed martial artist. A professional from 2007-2018, he last competed for the Professional Fighters League, but is better known for his 19-fight tenure with the UFC.

Background
Story was born in Tacoma, Washington and, at the age of three, his parents divorced. Story grew up in Spanaway, Washington, with his grandmother and his older sister, Elizabeth. Story began wrestling when he was around 12 years old and also began watching UFC fights. Story attended Bethel High School in Spanaway, Washington where he was a standout in both wrestling and football. Story continued his wrestling career at Southern Oregon University, where he was a runner-up in the 2006 NAIA National Championships, and began learning submission grappling from a friend during his sophomore year. After graduating with a degree in health education, Story embarked on a career in mixed martial arts.

Mixed martial arts career

Ultimate Fighting Championship
Story signed a four-fight deal with the UFC and made his promotional debut, losing to John Hathaway via unanimous decision on the UFC 99 card.

Story had his second UFC fight at UFC 103 after stepping in for Paul Daley against debuting Brian Foster. Story defeated Foster via arm-triangle choke submission at 1:09 of round two and earned Submission of the Night and Fight of the Night honors.

Story won his fight against Jesse Lennox at UFC Fight Night 20 held on January 11, 2010. The fight was a three-round war in which Story was given the unanimous decision win.

In January 2010, he was resigned to a new four-fight deal with the UFC. His first fight with the brand new contract was against Englishman, Nick Osipczak at UFC 112, the UFC's first trip to Abu Dhabi. Story won the fight via controversial split decision.

Story fought Dustin Hazelett on August 7, 2010 at UFC 117. After winning the first round, Story won via second-round TKO.

Story faced future title holder Johny Hendricks on December 4, 2010 at The Ultimate Fighter 12 Finale and won the fight via unanimous decision.

After his win over Hendricks, Story called out former number one contender, Thiago Alves. Alves accepted the fight, which took place on May 28, 2011 at UFC 130. Story outworked Alves with his grappling and ring control for the majority of the fight. By the 3rd round, Alves began to connect with Story repeatedly but it wasn't enough. Story won via unanimous decision.

Story was expected to face Nate Marquardt on June 26, 2011 at UFC on Versus 4, replacing an injured Anthony Johnson. Marquardt, however, pulled out of the fight the day of the weigh-ins and Story instead faced Charlie Brenneman. Story lost in a huge upset via unanimous decision.

Story lost to Martin Kampmann via split decision on November 19, 2011 at UFC 139. Dana White incorrectly reported at the post fight press conference that a judge's scores had been tabulated incorrectly and should have been announced as unanimous decision in favor of Kampmann.  According to the California State Athletic Commission's website and confirmed by MMADecisions.com, judge Susan Thomas-Gitlin in fact scored the fight in favor of Story.

Story was expected to face Rich Attonito on June 22, 2012 at UFC on FX: Maynard vs. Guida. However, Attonito was forced out of the bout with an injury and replaced by Papy Abedi. Abedi himself was also forced out of the bout with an injury and replaced by promotional newcomer Brock Jardine. Story won the fight via unanimous decision.

Story faced Demian Maia on October 13, 2012 at UFC 153. He lost the bout via first round submission due to a neck crank, this was his first submission and stoppage loss in his career.

Story was expected to face Sean Pierson on March 16, 2013 at UFC 158. However, Pierson was forced out of the bout with an injury and replaced by Quinn Mulhern. Story defeated Mulhern in the first round via TKO after landing a flurry of punches.

Story faced Mike Pyle on May 25, 2013 at UFC 160, replacing an injured Gunnar Nelson. He lost the fight via controversial split decision despite controlling most of the action and dropping Pyle with punches in the first round.

Story faced Brian Ebersole on November 16, 2013 at UFC 167. He won the fight via unanimous decision.

Story faced The Ultimate Fighter 17 winner Kelvin Gastelum on March 15, 2014 at UFC 171. He lost the back-and-forth fight via split decision.

Story was expected to face John Howard at UFC Fight Night 45 on July 16, 2014. However, Howard was forced out of the bout due to injury and was replaced by returning veteran Leonardo Mafra.  Story defeated Mafra via submission in the second round.

Story faced Gunnar Nelson on October 4, 2014 at UFC Fight Night 53. Despite suffering a fracture in his left tibia in the second round, he won the fight via split decision.

Story was expected to face Erick Silva on June 27, 2015 at UFC Fight Night 70.  However, Silva was removed from the card on June 19, after visa issues restricted his entry to the United States.  In turn, Story was removed from the card as well. The bout with Story was rescheduled and was expected to take place on August 23, 2015 at UFC Fight Night 74.  Subsequently, Story pulled out of the bout on August 11 citing injury and was replaced by Neil Magny.

Story returned from an 18-month layoff to face Tarec Saffiedine on May 29, 2016 at UFC Fight Night 88. He won the fight by unanimous decision.

In the ultimate fight in UFC, Story faced Donald Cerrone on August 20, 2016 at UFC 202. He lost the fight by TKO in the second round.

Post-UFC career
On March 12, 2018, Story announced that he has signed a contract with Professional Fighters League albeit UFC had offered a contract extension.

On November 8, 2018, Story announced his retirement from professional competition.

Personal life
Aside from being a professional fighter, Story is also a member of the National Guard.

Championships and accomplishments
 Ultimate Fighting Championships
 Submission of the Night (One time) vs. Brian Foster 
 Fight of the Night (One time) vs. Brian Foster

Mixed martial arts record

|- 
|Loss
|align=center|21–10
|Handesson Ferreira
|TKO (arm injury)
|PFL 10
|
|align=center|2
|align=center|1:15
|Washington, D.C., United States
|
|-
|Win
|align=center| 21–9
|Carlton Minus
|Technical Submission (rear-naked choke)
|PFL 6 
|
|align=center|2
|align=center|2:55
|Atlantic City, New Jersey, United States
|  
|-
|Win
|align=center| 20–9
|Yuri Villefort
|Decision (unanimous)
|PFL 3 
|
|align=center|3
|align=center|5:00
|Washington, D.C., United States
|  
|-
|Loss
|align=center| 19–9
|Donald Cerrone
|TKO (punches)
|UFC 202 
|
|align=center|2
|align=center|2:02
|Las Vegas, Nevada, United States
|  
|-
|Win
|align=center| 19–8
|Tarec Saffiedine
|Decision (unanimous)
|UFC Fight Night: Almeida vs. Garbrandt
|
|align=center|3
|align=center|5:00
|Las Vegas, Nevada, United States
|
|-
|Win
|align=center| 18–8
|Gunnar Nelson
|Decision (split)
|UFC Fight Night: Nelson vs. Story
|
|align=center|5
|align=center|5:00
|Stockholm, Sweden
|
|-
|Win
|align=center| 17–8 
|Leonardo Mafra
|Submission (arm-triangle choke)
|UFC Fight Night: Cowboy vs. Miller
|
|align=center| 2
|align=center| 2:12
|Atlantic City, New Jersey, United States
|
|-
|Loss
|align=center| 16–8
|Kelvin Gastelum
|Decision (split)
|UFC 171
|
|align=center| 3
|align=center| 5:00
|Dallas, Texas, United States
|
|-
|Win
|align=center| 16–7
| Brian Ebersole
| Decision (unanimous)
| UFC 167
| 
|align=center| 3
|align=center| 5:00
|Las Vegas, Nevada, United States
|
|-
|Loss
|align=center| 15–7
|Mike Pyle
|Decision (split)
|UFC 160
|
|align=center| 3
|align=center| 5:00
|Las Vegas, Nevada, United States
|
|-
|Win
|align=center| 15–6 
|Quinn Mulhern
|TKO (punches)
|UFC 158
|
|align=center| 1
|align=center| 3:05
|Montreal, Quebec, Canada
|
|-
| Loss
|align=center| 14–6
|Demian Maia
|Submission (neck crank)
|UFC 153
|
|align=center| 1
|align=center| 2:30
|Rio de Janeiro, Brazil
|
|-
|Win
|align=center| 14–5
|Brock Jardine
|Decision (unanimous)
|UFC on FX: Maynard vs. Guida
|
|align=center| 3
|align=center| 5:00
|Atlantic City, New Jersey, United States
|
|-
| Loss
|align=center| 13–5
|Martin Kampmann
| Decision (split)
| UFC 139
| 
|align=center| 3
|align=center| 5:00
|San Jose, California, United States
| 
|-
| Loss
|align=center| 13–4
|Charlie Brenneman
| Decision (unanimous)
| UFC Live: Kongo vs. Barry
| 
|align=center| 3
|align=center| 5:00
|Pittsburgh, Pennsylvania, United States
| 
|-
| Win
|align=center| 13–3
|Thiago Alves
| Decision (unanimous)
| UFC 130
| 
|align=center| 3
|align=center| 5:00
|Las Vegas, Nevada, United States
| 
|-
| Win
|align=center| 12–3
|Johny Hendricks
| Decision (unanimous)
| The Ultimate Fighter: Team GSP vs. Team Koscheck Finale
| 
|align=center| 3
|align=center| 5:00
|Las Vegas, Nevada, United States
| 
|-
| Win
|align=center| 11–3
|Dustin Hazelett
| TKO (punches)
| UFC 117
| 
|align=center| 2
|align=center| 1:15
|Oakland, California, United States
| 
|-
| Win
|align=center| 10–3
|Nick Osipczak
| Decision (split)
| UFC 112
| 
|align=center| 3
|align=center| 5:00
|Abu Dhabi, United Arab Emirates
| 
|-
| Win
|align=center| 9–3
|Jesse Lennox
| Decision (split)
| UFC Fight Night: Maynard vs. Diaz
| 
|align=center| 3
|align=center| 5:00
|Fairfax, Virginia, United States
| 
|-
| Win
|align=center| 8–3
|Brian Foster
| Submission (arm-triangle choke)
| UFC 103
| 
|align=center| 2
|align=center| 1:09
|Dallas, Texas, United States
| 
|-
| Loss
|align=center| 7–3
|John Hathaway
| Decision (unanimous)
| UFC 99
| 
|align=center| 3
|align=center| 5:00
|Cologne, Germany
| 
|-
| Win
|align=center| 7–2
|Brandon Melendez
| Submission (rear-naked choke)
| EWC: Vancouver
| 
|align=center| 1
|align=center| 2:17
|Ridgefield, Washington, United States
|
|-
| Win
|align=center| 6–2
|Wesley Welch
| KO (punch)
| Carnage at the Creek 3
| 
|align=center| 1
|align=center| N/A
|Shelton, Washington, United States
| 
|-
| Win
|align=center| 5–2
|Jake Ellenberger
| Decision (unanimous)
| SportFight 23
| 
|align=center| 3
|align=center| 5:00
|Portland, Oregon, United States
| 
|-
| Win
|align=center| 4–2
|Ryan Healy
| Decision (unanimous)
| EWC: May Massacre
| 
|align=center| 5
|align=center| 5:00
|Salem, Oregon, United States
|
|-
| Win
|align=center| 3–2
|James Dodge
| Submission (rear-naked choke)
| EWC: Welterweight War
| 
|align=center| 1
|align=center| 3:37
|Salem, Oregon, United States
| 
|-
| Win
|align=center| 2–2
|Jake Paul
| TKO (punches)
| EWC: Capital Invasion
| 
|align=center| 2
|align=center| 1:03
|Salem, Oregon, United States
| 
|-
| Loss
|align=center| 1–2
|Nathan Coy
| Decision (unanimous)
| SportFight 21: Seasons Beatings
| 
|align=center| 3
|align=center| 5:00
|Portland, Oregon, United States
| 
|-
| Win
|align=center| 1–1
|Julio Paulino
| Decision (unanimous)
| AFC 41: Thankful Throwdowns
| 
|align=center| 3
|align=center| 5:00
|Anchorage, Alaska, United States
| 
|-
| Loss
|align=center| 0–1
|Mario Miranda
| Decision (unanimous)
| Conquest of the Cage
| 
|align=center| 3
|align=center| 5:00
|Airway Heights, Washington, United States
|

See also
 List of current UFC fighters
 List of male mixed martial artists

References

External links

UFC Profile

1984 births
Living people
American male mixed martial artists
Mixed martial artists from Washington (state)
People from Spanaway, Washington
Welterweight mixed martial artists
Mixed martial artists utilizing collegiate wrestling
Southern Oregon University alumni
Sportspeople from Tacoma, Washington
Ultimate Fighting Championship male fighters
American male sport wrestlers
Amateur wrestlers